Hypophytala hyettina, the western flash, is a butterfly in the family Lycaenidae. It is found in Sierra Leone, Liberia, Ivory Coast and Ghana. The habitat consists of forests.

References

External links
Die Gross-Schmetterlinge der Erde 13: Die Afrikanischen Tagfalter. Plate XIII 65 d

Butterflies described in 1897
Poritiinae
Butterflies of Africa
Taxa named by Per Olof Christopher Aurivillius